Reborrowing is the process where a word travels from one language to another and then back to the originating language in a different form or with a different meaning. This path is indicated by A → B → A, where A is the originating language, and can take many forms. A reborrowed word is sometimes called a Rückwanderer (German, a 'returner').

The result is generally a doublet, where the reborrowed word exists alongside the original word, though in other cases the original word may have died out. Alternatively, a specific sense of a borrowed word can be reborrowed as a semantic loan; for example, English pioneer was borrowed from Middle French in the sense of "digger, foot soldier, pedestrian", then acquired the sense of "early colonist, innovator" in English, which was reborrowed into French. In other cases the term may be calqued (loan translated) at some stage, such as English ready-to-wear → French prêt-à-porter (1951) → English prêt-à-porter (1957).

In some cases the borrowing process can be more complicated and the words might move through different languages before coming back to the originating language. The single move from one language to the other is called "loan" (see loanword). Reborrowing is the result of more than one loan, when the final recipient language is the same as the originating one.

Examples

Reborrowed morphemes
A similar process occurs when a word is coined in a language based on roots from another language, and then the compound is borrowed into this other language or a modern descendant. In the West this primarily occurs with classical compounds, formed on Latin or Ancient Greek roots, which may then be borrowed into a Romance language or Modern Greek. Latin is sufficiently widespread that Latinate terms coined in a non-Romance language (such as English or German) and then borrowed by a Romance language (such as French or Spanish) are not conspicuous, but modern coinages on Ancient Greek roots borrowed into Modern Greek are, and include terms such as τηλεγράφημα tilegráfima ('telegram'). These are very common.

Often these words could have been coined in Chinese, but happened to be coined first in Japanese; notable examples include  bunka ('culture') and  kakumei ('revolution').

See also 
 Gairaigo
 Inkhorn term
 Language contact
 Loanword
 Wanderwort
 Word coinage

Notes

References

Historical linguistics
Types of words
Word coinage